Claudia Dey (born  1972/1973) is a Canadian writer, based out of Toronto.

Dey's first novel, Stunt, was published by Coach House Books. It was one of The Globe and Mail's "2008 Globe 100" and Quill and Quire's "Books of the Year." It was nominated for the Amazon First Novel Award.

Dey's second novel, Heartbreaker, was published by Random House (U.S.), HarperCollins (Canada), and The Borough Press (U.K.) It was listed by Publishers Weekly in "Writers to Watch Fall 2018: Anticipated Debuts" and was on The Millions "Most Anticipated: The Great Second Half 2018 Book Preview".

From 2007 to 2009, Dey wrote the "Group Therapy" column in The Globe and Mail. She also wrote the sex column in Toro under the pseudonym Bebe O'Shea. Her writing and interviews have been published in The Paris Review and The Believer.

She is also the author of several plays: Beaver (2000), The Gwendolyn Poems (2002) and Trout Stanley (2005). They have been performed in Toronto, Montreal, New York and Vancouver. The Gwendolyn Poems, about Canadian poet, Gwendolyn MacEwen, was nominated for the 2002 Governor General's Awards and the Trillium Book Award.

In addition to her literary work, Dey has also acted in three feature films, Amy George (2011), The Oxbow Cure (2013) and The Intestine (2016), and is a co-founder of the design studio and clothing brand, Horses Atelier.

Education 
Dey studied English literature at McGill University and playwriting at the National Theatre School of Canada, where she graduated in 1997.

Personal life
Dey is married to Canadian musician Don Kerr. They live in Toronto with their two sons.

Works

 Beaver (2000)
 The Gwendolyn Poems (2002)
 Trout Stanley (2005)
 Stunt (2008)
 How to Be a Bush Pilot: A Field Guide to Getting Luckier (2012)
 Heartbreaker (2018)

References

External links

Drama Online: Claudia Dey

https://www.theparisreview.org/blog/2018/04/26/the-child-thing-an-interview-with-sheila-heti/
https://www.believermag.com/issues/201307/?read=interview_feist
https://believermag.tumblr.com/post/26150434236/correspondence
https://fashionmagazine.com/culture/claudia-dey-summer-essay/
https://torontolife.com/style/fashion/claudia-dey-hat-tricks/
http://www.flare.com/fashion/editorial-moving-pieces/
"But Who Will Slap Marguerite?": Short Fiction at Joyland
Alone With A Friend in the Absence of Hipness: Ryeberg Curated Videos

1970s births
Living people
Canadian women dramatists and playwrights
21st-century Canadian novelists
Canadian columnists
Canadian women journalists
Canadian women novelists
McGill University alumni
National Theatre School of Canada alumni
Canadian women columnists
Writers from Toronto
21st-century Canadian dramatists and playwrights
21st-century Canadian women writers
Canadian women non-fiction writers